is a Japanese actress, model, and writer. She is a founder of the KuToo movement. In 2019, she was included on the BBC's 100 Women list.

Early life
Born on 1 January 1987 in Komaki, Aichi Prefecture, Ishikawa grew up in Tajimi, Gifu Prefecture.

Career
In 2004, Ishikawa started her career as a gravure idol. She has since then released more than 30 image DVDs and won the Cream Girl competition. She started acting in 2008. In 2014, she starred in the film Onna no Ana. She has also appeared in films such as Yuwaku wa Arashi no Yoru ni and Itsuka no Natsu.

KuToo movement
In January 2019, Ishikawa wrote a complaint about the requirement to wear high heels at work, which was shared nearly 30,000 times on Twitter. She launched an online petition to call for a law that bans employers from forcing women to wear high heels. The name of the KuToo movement derives from the Japanese words for shoes (kutsu) and pain (kutsū), as well as the Me Too movement. In June 2019, Ishikawa submitted the petition to the Ministry of Health, Labour and Welfare.

Recognition
In October 2019, Ishikawa was included on the BBC's annual 100 Women list.

Filmography

Feature films
 Onna no Ana (2014)
 Yuwaku wa Arashi no Yoru ni (2016)
 Itsuka no Natsu (2018)

Books
 #KuToo (2019)

Photo books
 Act.1 (2014) 
 Watashi no Naka no Akuma (2015)

References

External links
 
  (in Japanese)
 
 

Living people
1987 births
21st-century Japanese actresses
21st-century Japanese women writers
Actors from Aichi Prefecture
Actresses from Gifu Prefecture
BBC 100 Women
Japanese female models
Japanese film actresses
People from Komaki, Aichi
Writers from Aichi Prefecture
Writers from Gifu Prefecture
Japanese feminists